The Holden EJ is a motor vehicle produced by General Motors-Holden's in Australia from 1962 to 1963. Introduced in July 1962, the EJ replaced the Holden EK series.

Overview
The styling of the EJ was a radical departure from that of the EK, with a lower roofline, a flatter boot and an absence of fins. Improvements were made to the brakes, front suspension and the Hydra-matic automatic transmission.

A new luxury model, the Holden Premier, made its debut in the EJ series, and featured leather interior, bucket seats, metallic paint, a heater/demister with centre console, and arm rests on all four doors. It was fitted with Hydra-matic 3-speed automatic transmission as standard equipment, which was optional on other EJ series models.

Model range
On introduction, the EJ range consisted of four-door sedans in three trim levels and five-door station wagons in two trim levels. A two-door coupe utility and a two-door panel van were added to the range in January 1963.
The seven models were marketed as follows:
 Holden Standard Sedan
 Holden Special Sedan
 Holden Premier Sedan
 Holden Standard Station Sedan
 Holden Special Station Sedan
 Holden Utility
 Holden Panel Van

Engines
All EJ models were powered by a  inline six-cylinder engine, producing . Since the introduction of the original Holden 48-215 model in 1948, Holdens had been fitted with what was commonly known as the grey motor. The EJ was the last Holden to be equipped with that engine.

Production and replacement
After a production run of 154,811 vehicles, the EJ was replaced by the Holden EH series in August 1963. The 1,000,000th Holden, an EJ Premier, was produced on 26 October 1962.

The EJ was also assembled in New Zealand by GMNZ, and was marketed in South Africa as well.

References

Further reading
 Norm Darwin, 100 Years of GM in Australia, 2002
 Norm Darwin, The history of Holden since 1917, 1983
 AC Bushby, The Holden collection: a nostalgic look at the first 30 years of Holden cars in Australia, 1988

External links
 A Brief History of the EJ Holden Includes scans of Holden EJ sales brochures and advertisements.

Cars of Australia
EJ
Cars introduced in 1962
Cars discontinued in 1963